Turkmenistan competed at the 2000 Summer Olympics in Sydney, Australia.

Athletics

Men
Field events

Women
Field events

Judo

Shooting 

Turkmenistan has qualified a single shooter.

Men

Table tennis

Singles

Weightlifting 

Turkmenistan has qualified a single weightlifter.

Wrestling

Greco–Roman

References
 
 International Olympic Committee (2001). The Results. Retrieved 12 November 2005.
 Sydney Organising Committee for the Olympic Games (2001). Official Report of the XXVII Olympiad Volume 1: Preparing for the Games. Retrieved 20 November 2005.
 Sydney Organising Committee for the Olympic Games (2001). Official Report of the XXVII Olympiad Volume 2: Celebrating the Games. Retrieved 20 November 2005.
 Sydney Organising Committee for the Olympic Games (2001). The Results. Retrieved 20 November 2005.
 International Olympic Committee Web Site
 sports-reference

Nations at the 2000 Summer Olympics
2000
2000 in Turkmenistani sport